Benin Marina is a four-star hotel in Cotonou, Benin. It is located at Boulevard De La Marina, B.P. 1901 in the Haie Vive neighborhood, near the Cardinal Bernardin Gantin International Airport and the Supercenter Erevan. It is the largest hotel in the country. It is located in a large building which was formerly a Sheraton hotel, west of the old port of Cotonou. Set in landscaped gardens, the hotel contains two swimming pools, three tennis courts and small 9-hole golf course. The building is only four storeys high but covers a significant area of land. The swimming pool is located next to the beach. The hotel has 200 rooms, 1 Royal Suite, 8 Junior Suites and 12 bungalows. The hotel contains the 'Le Popo' Coffeeshop Restaurant,  'Les Tanekas' Grill Bar by the pool,  'Le Nokoué' Pianobar and the 'Le Tèkè' Night Club / Karaoke Bar. The hotel is occasionally  used for important diplomatic meetings in Cotonou and contains 1 conference room and 6 meeting rooms.

References

External links
Official site

Hotels in Benin
Buildings and structures in Cotonou
Hotel buildings completed in 1982